The Grigorovich ROM-2 (bureau designation MR-3; military designation MDR-1) was a long-range reconnaissance flying boat designed by the Grigorovich Design Bureau for the Soviet Navy in the late 1920s.

Design
The ROM-2 (ROM = Razviedchik Otkrytovo Morya [Open Sea Reconnaissance]) was a long range maritime reconnaissance sesquiplane flying boat with the engines arranged in tractor form in two separate nacelles. The wing and the hull were radically redesigned, most of the plywood wing skin was replaced by fabric. As a result, payload (including fuel) almost doubled, and other parameters were improved

Test flights began in the summer of 1929, and the ROM-2 had much better performance than the ROM-1, but those performance results were unsatisfactory for the 1930s. Testing ended after a rough landing on one flight. Modifications were undertaken to the airframe, with the hull shortened by 0.2m, the engines raised above the wing on short N-struts, and the aircraft was redesignated ROM-2bis, but the aircraft never flew in this configuration.

Specifications

References

Sources

Biplanes
Flying boats
1920s Soviet and Russian military reconnaissance aircraft
ROM-2
Aircraft first flown in 1929